Kincaid may refer to:

People
 Kincaid (surname)

Places

Canada
 Kincaid, Saskatchewan, a village

United States
 Kincaid, Illinois, a city
 Kincaid, Kansas, a city
 Kincaid, Virginia, an unincorporated community
 Kincaid, West Virginia, a census-designated place
 Kincaid Lake, Pendleton County, Kentucky
 Kincaid Park, a municipal park in Anchorage, Alaska

Other uses
Clan Kincaid, a US-based organization dedicated to the Kincaid family's Scottish roots
The Kincaid School, Piney Point Village, Texas
Kincaid Chance, from the novel The Brothers K, by David James Duncan
John G. Kincaid & Company, a former British marine engine manufacturer

See also
 Kincaid v. Gibson
 Thomas Kinkade (1958–2012), painter of realistic, bucolic, and idyllic subjects
 Kincade (disambiguation)